The team eventing was an equestrian event held as part of the Equestrian at the 1964 Summer Olympics programme.  The event was held from 16 to 19 October, and consisted merely of summing the scores of the team's top 3 (out of 4) horse and rider pairs in the individual eventing.

Medalists

Results

References

Sources
 

Equestrian at the 1964 Summer Olympics